The 1971 Argentina rugby union tour of South Africa  was a series of 14 matches played by the Argentina national rugby union team in June and July 1971.

It was the second tour of Argentinian team in South Africa, six year after the 1965 tour .

The "Pumas" didn't play against Springboks (playing meanwhile in Australia, but against the Gazelles, the selection of emerging young players.

Originally was scheduled also a match in Rhodesia, but it was cancelled after a prohibition of Argentine government.

Matches

 South East Transvall: M.de Pager; B.Strydom, J.Killitan, S.Breytenbach, K.Ferreira; K.Nel, J.Van Zyl; O.Du Preez, L.Luus, J.de Lange; L.Van der Merwe, K.Venter; S.Du Tand, H.Steenkamp (capt.), J.Taljaard.Argentina:D.Morgan; M.Pascual, R.Matarazzo, A.Travaglini, M.Walther; H.Méndez, G.Blacksley; R.Foster, R.Handley, L.García Yáñez; B.Otaño, A.Anthony; M.Morgan, H.Silva (capt.), N.Carbone. 

Eastern Orange Free State: G.Kotze: M.Van Rensburg, K.Wessel, P.Pultney, J.Visagie; D.Fourie, Pultney; R.Simes, J.Mintz, T.Human; G.Jordany K.Scheespers; C.Betern, J.Bell, T.Lyell.Argentina:D.Morgan; M.Pascual, J.Walther, A.Travaglini, M.Walther, H.Méndez, A.Etchegaray; R.Foster, R.Handley, H.Incola: N.Carbone, B.Otaño; A.Anthony, H.Silva (capt.), J.Wittman.

Northern Universities: O.de Meyer; A.Millar, D.van Wyk, B.Grace, Ch.Parker; D.Gradwell, J.Osthuizen; R.Portgieter, K.Resnick (capt.), N.Bezuidenbout; P.Bezuidenbout, T.Bernard; P.Du Pleussis, J.Stofberg, B.Bernardo.Argentina:D.Morgan; E.Morgan, A.Rodríguez Jurado, A.Travaglini, M.Walther; T.Harris-Smith, A.Etchegaray; R.Foster, R.Handley, L.García Yáñez; A.Anthony B.Otaño; N.Carbone, H.Silva (capt.), M.Morgan.

South African Colleges: J.Sauerman; G.Germisius, J.Croftd-Jones, J.de Vos, Jan Pretorius; C.Classen, B.Wolmarans; R.van der Merwe, J.Wagenaer, R.Marchant; C.Knoetze, P.Clarke; J.Joubert, J.Kleingeld, M.Kocket.Argentina:R.Espagnol; M.Pascual, A.Rodríguez Jurado, J.Walther, A.Travaglini; T.Harris-Smith, G.Blaksley; H.Incola, J.Constante, R.Foster, A.Anthony, B.Otaño; H.Miguens, H.Silva (capt.), J.Wittman. 

 Natal: M.Swanby; R.Pitcher, R.Greyling, P.de Lange, M.Warner; T.Mehrtens, C.Hola; T. Dannahauser, J.Krotzingery R.Steyn (capt.); M.Van Rensburg, M.Mckenzie; F.Jackson, S.Labuschagno, D.Van der Berg. Argentina:D.Morgan; M.Pascual, R.Matarazzo, A.Travaglini, J.Walther; R.Espagnol, G.Blaksley; J.Wittman, H.Silva (capt.), N.Carbone; A.Anthony, B.Otaño; R.Foster, R.Handley, H.Incola. 

 Northern Orange Free State: J.Louw; F.Aucamp; B.Harris, D.Boytma, W.Armes; F.Froneman; J.van Eevter; H.Boerseun Roux, W.Potgieter; E.Kapp, J.Vandenberg; H.Fourie.B.Colette, J.Tredoux. Argentina:D.Morgan; M.Pascual, J.Walther, R.Matarazzo, E.Morgan; R.Espagnol y a.Etchegaray; M.Morgan, H.Silva (capt.), J.Wittman; A.Anthony, J.Fernández; A.Orzábal, R. Handley, L.García Yáñez  

Gazelles: J.van Deventer; T.Du Toit, A.Swartz, A.van Staden, L.Vogel; J.Barnard, C.Hola; B.Neetling, J.Wagenaar, R.Potgieter; J.Jamneck, J.van Aswegen; M.van Resnburg, P.vanDeventer, C.Grobler. Argentina:D.Morgan; M.Pascual, R.Matarazzo, A.Rodríguez Jurado, A.Travaglini; R.Espagnol, G.Blaksley; H.Silva (capt.), J.Wittman, N.Carbone; B.Otaño, A.Anthony; R.Foster, R.Handley, L.García Yáñez. 

South Western Districts: G.Kok; J.Bester, F.Stander, F.van Zyl, H.Faricius; S.de Oplesis, S.Bradley; P.Carstens, H.Vester, L.Du Toit; T.van der Westhuizen, J.Swec, C.Pretorius, S.Jonker.Argentina:D.Morgan; M.Walther, A.Travaglini, A.Rodríguez Jurado, M.Pascual; T.Harris-Smith, A.Etchegaray; R.Foster, J.Constante, H.Incola; M.Morgan, B.Otaño; L.García Yáñez, H.Silva (capt.), J.Wittman. 

South Africa CD: A.Joubet; O.Fourie, B.Swartz, K.Walkdeck, P.Ackerman; L.Gerber, F.Duplessis; D.van der Merwe, D.Slabbert, D.Coleshan; B.Stander, K.Engelbrecht; J.Kritzinger, B.Jamneck, D.Vorster.
Argentina:D.Morgan; M.Pascual, A.Travaglini, A.Rodríguez Jurado, M.Walther; T.Harris-Smith, A.Etchegaray; H.Silva (capt.), M.Morgan, J.Wittman; A.Anthony, B.Otaño; R.Foster, R.Handley, L.García Yáñez. 

 Southern Universities: R.Carlson; P.Berning, J.Snyman, J.van der Merwe, J.Engelbrecht (capt.); J.Nel, F.de Villiers; R.Bryant, B.Butler, R.Stader; J.Le Roux, G.Watt; F.Burger, B.Cohetes, P.Le Roux.Argentina:D.Morgan; M.Pascual, A.Travaglini, J.Walther, M.Walther; T.Harris-Smith, A.Etchegaray, H.Silva (capt.), M.Morgan, J.Wittman; A.Anthony, B.Otaño; R.Foster, R.Handley, L.García Yáñez 

 North west Cape: Ch.Husamen; P.Maas, K.de Jong, J.Kotze, A.van Tonder; L.Harvey, T.van Zyl; N.De Pager; D.Herman, T.Kamfer; J.Niewoudt, H.Engelbrech (capt.); M.Vincent, V.Hanekom, B.Young.Argentina:H.Silva (capt.); E.Morgan, G.Blacksley, J.Wittman, N.Carbone; A. Anthony, J.Fernández; H.Incola, U.Constante, R.Foster.

Argentina:D.Morgan; M.Walther, A.Rodríguez Jurado, G.Blacksley, N.Pérez; R.Espagnol, A.Etchegaray; N.Carbone, H.Miguens, M.Morgan; J.Fernández, A.Orzábal; H.Incola, J.Constante, L.García Yáñez 

Gazelles: J.van Deventer; D.Svodoba, R.Swartz, T.Symons, A.Leter; D.Svodoba, R.Holm; T.Neetling (capt.), J.Wagenaar, D.Coleshaw; P.van Devente, J.van Aswegen; M.van Rensburg, K.van Dyck, K.Grobler.Argentina:D.Morgan; M.Walther, A.Rodríguez Jurado, A.Travaglini, M.Pascual; T.Harris, A.Etchegaray; H.Silva (capt.), J.Wittman, M.Morgan; A.Anthony, J.Fernández; R.Foster, R.Handley, H.Incola. 

Griqualand West: T.Smith; O.Fourie, B.Swartz, K.Waldeck, J.Lategan; P.Visagie, J.Viljoen; B.Fourie, D.Slabbert, S.Nel; P.Smith, J.Theron; V.Schnetler, P.van Deventer, D.Vorster.
Argentina:D.Morgan; M.Pascual, A.Travaglini, R.Matarazzo, M.Walther; T.Harris-Smith, A.Etchegaray; H.Silva (capt.), H.Miguens, J.Wittman; B.Otaño, L.García Yáñez; R.Foster, R.Handley, H.Incola

Sources

Notes 

Argentina national rugby union team tours
1971
1971 in South African rugby union
TOUR